Quercus is a formerly independent publishing house, based in London, that was acquired by Hodder & Stoughton in 2014. It was founded in 2004 by Mark Smith and Wayne Davies.

Quercus is known for its lists in crime (publishing such authors as Elly Griffiths, Philip Kerr, Peter May, Peter Temple), its MacLehose Press imprint (formerly headed by Christopher MacLehose), which publishes translated (often prize-winning) works by authors such as Philippe Claudel, Stieg Larsson, and Valerio Varesi, its literary fiction titles (including by Kimberley Freeman, Prajwal Parajuly) and its Jo Fletcher Books imprint, which publishes science fiction, fantasy, and horror.

Details
Smith and Davies had previously worked together at the Orion Publishing Group.

In 2011, Quercus was chosen as the Bonnier Publishing Publisher of the Year at the Bookseller Industry Awards in London.

American imprint SilverOak was co-owned with Sterling Publishing. In March 2016, Quercus launched fiction and non-fiction imprint riverrun.

Modern & Contemporary Fiction Authors
Lucy Diamond
Beth O’Leary
Rebecca Wait
Adrienne Young

Thriller Authors
JP Delaney
Charlotte Duckworth
Emily Freud 
Olivia Kiernan
Victoria Selman
Jo Spain

References

External links
 Quercus 
 Official Jo Fletcher Books website
 Official MacLehose Press website
 Quercus catalogue

Book publishing companies of the United Kingdom
Companies based in the City of London
Publishing companies established in 2004
2004 establishments in the United Kingdom